Atriplex littoralis, the grassleaf orache or  grass-leaved orache (also spelled orach) is a species of shrub in the family Amaranthaceae. It is 70–80 cm high and grows along beaches in many places in the world. It has narrow leaves and grey-green color. In northern Europe it has flowers from July until September.

References

littoralis
Flora of Michigan
Flora of New Jersey
Plants described in 1753
Taxa named by Carl Linnaeus